Michał Filip (born 31 August 1994) is a Polish volleyball player, a member of the Turkish club Develi Belediyespor, Efeler Ligi.

Career
In the 2013/2014 season, they won the Polish SuperCup and the silver medal of the Polish Championship 2013/2014 after losing the final (0-3 in matches, to three wins) against PGE Skra Bełchatów. He moved to AZS Politechnika Warszawska on loan from Asseco Resovia Rzeszów in 2014. He extended his contract on following 2 seasons. After 3 seasons his contract with club from Warsaw was not renewed. On May 2, 2017 he moved to Cerrad Czarni Radom. Filip debuted in Polish national team B in July 2015. On August 14, 2015 he achieved first medal as national team player – bronze of European League. His national team won 3rd place match with Estonia (3–0).

Sporting achievements

Clubs
 National championships
 2013/2014  Polish SuperCup, with Asseco Resovia
 2013/2014  Polish Championship, with Asseco Resovia

External links
 Player profile at CEV.eu
 Player profile at PlusLiga.pl
 Player profile at WorldofVolley.com
 Player profile at Volleybox.net

References

1994 births
Living people
People from Rzeszów
Sportspeople from Podkarpackie Voivodeship
Polish men's volleyball players
Resovia (volleyball) players
Projekt Warsaw players
Czarni Radom players
BKS Visła Bydgoszcz players
Stal Nysa players